John Fennelly was an Irish born Roman Catholic Bishop of Madras in India from 1841 until 1868. Fennelly was from Moyne, County Tipperary, studied for the priesthood in Maynooth College, and was ordained, he came to India in 1839 as part of the Maynooth Mission to Madras, and appointed Bishop in 1841, succeeding another Irish born Bishop Patrick Joseph Carew. Fennelly was succeeded by his brother Stephen Fennelly  as Bishop of Madras in 1868. 
He served as bishop until his death in 1868.

See also
Catholic Church in India

References

1816 births
1880 deaths
Alumni of St Patrick's College, Maynooth
Irish expatriate Catholic bishops